Pachynoa xanthochyta is a moth in the family Crambidae. It was described by Turner in 1933. It is found in Australia, where it has been recorded from Queensland and Asia (including Bhutan).

The wingspan is about 30 mm. The wings are translucent yellow with black markings.

References

Moths described in 1933
Spilomelinae